Andreas Friedrich Bauer (18 August 1783 – 27 December 1860) was a German engineer who developed the first functional steam-powered printing press with his colleague Friedrich Koenig, who had invented the technology and sold it to The Times in London in 1814.

Born in Stuttgart, Bauer joined Koenig in 1817 to found Koenig & Bauer at the Oberzell monastery near Würzburg.

Printing capacity 
The table lists the maximum number of pages which the various press designs of Koenig & Bauer could print per hour, compared to earlier hand-operated printing presses:

References

Sources 

19th-century German inventors
1783 births
1860 deaths